The Andreotti II Cabinet was the 28th cabinet of the Italian Republic. It held office from 26 June 1972 to 8 July 1973, for a total of 377 days (1 year, 13 days). It was also known as Andreotti-Malagodi Cabinet.

He obtained the confidence of the House on July 7, 1972 with 329 votes in favor and 288 against.

He also obtained the trust in the Senate on July 13, 1972 with 163 votes in favor and 155 against.

The government fell due to the withdrawal of support from the PRI, following the dimming of the private cable TV "Telebiella", imposed by the minister Gioia.

The government resigned on June 12, 1973.

Party breakdown
 Christian Democracy (DC): Prime minister, 16 ministers, 40 undersecretaries
 Italian Democratic Socialist Party (PSDI): 5 ministers, 10 undersecretaries
 Italian Liberal Party (PLI): 4 ministers, 8 undersecretaries

Composition

|}

References

Italian governments
1972 establishments in Italy
1973 disestablishments in Italy
Cabinets established in 1972
Cabinets disestablished in 1973
Andreotti 2 Cabinet